Aldo Osmar Adorno Moreira (born 8 April 1982) is a Paraguayan footballer who plays as a forward for P.O. Xylotymbou in the Cypriot Third Division.

Career

Paraguay – Israel – Spain
Adorno started his career from Sportivo Luqueño of Paraguay. He moved from Sol de América to Maccabi Tel Aviv on summer of 2003. The next year he played for UD Almería in the Spanish Segunda División. He also played for CD Baza.

Cyprus

E.N. Paralimni – AEK Larnaca – Apollon Limassol
He moved to Cyprus and Enosis in 2006. One year later he moved to AEK Larnaca, where he stayed for two seasons. In summer 2009 he signed a contract with Apollon Limassol and in his first season with Apollon he helped his team to win the 2009–10 Cypriot Cup.

APOEL
In June 2011 he signed a two-year contract with APOEL. On 20 July 2011, he scored his first official goal for APOEL, in a UEFA Champions League 2nd qualifying round match against Skënderbeu Korçë, by scoring APOEL's third goal in a 4–0 home win. He also appeared in four 2011–12 UEFA Champions League matches for APOEL, in the club's surprising run to the quarter-finals of the competition. On 9 August 2012, he scored the only goal in APOEL's 0–1 victory against Aalesunds FK at Color Line Stadion, for the return leg of the UEFA Europa League 2nd qualifying round. On 3 September 2012, Adorno scored a hat-trick in APOEL's 0–5 win at Tasos Markou Stadium against Enosis Neon Paralimni for the first matchday of the 2012–13 Cypriot First Division. Two months later, on 5 November 2012, Adorno scored his second hat-trick of the season in APOEL's 4–1 league win at GSP Stadium against Ayia Napa. At the end of the season, he became a champion for the first time in his career after winning the 2012–13 Cypriot First Division with APOEL. The next season, his third as an APOEL player, he won all the titles in Cyprus, the Cypriot League, the Cypriot Cup and the Cypriot Super Cup. On 1 September 2014, his contract with APOEL was mutually terminated.

Metalurh Donetsk
On 10 September 2014, Adorno signed a contract with Ukrainian side Metalurh Donetsk. But in the winter transfer window, he returned Cyprus with Ermis Aradippou.

Honours
 Apollon Limassol
Cypriot Cup (1) : 2009–10

 APOEL
Cypriot First Division (2) : 2012–13, 2013–14
Cypriot Cup (1) : 2013–14
Cypriot Super Cup (2) : 2011, 2013

Personal info
Aldo Adorno also holds a Spanish passport, except of the Paraguayan.

References

External links
APOEL official profile

Profile and statistics at eliteprospects

1982 births
Living people
Paraguayan footballers
Paraguayan emigrants to Spain
Association football midfielders
Club Sol de América footballers
Sportivo Luqueño players
Irapuato F.C. footballers
Cruz Azul footballers
UD Almería players
Maccabi Tel Aviv F.C. players
Enosis Neon Paralimni FC players
AEK Larnaca FC players
Apollon Limassol FC players
APOEL FC players
FC Metalurh Donetsk players
Nea Salamis Famagusta FC players
Othellos Athienou F.C. players
ENTHOI Lakatamia FC players
P.O. Xylotymbou players
Israeli Premier League players
Cypriot First Division players
Cypriot Second Division players
Ukrainian Premier League players
Paraguayan expatriate footballers
Expatriate footballers in Cyprus
Expatriate footballers in Israel
Expatriate footballers in Mexico
Expatriate footballers in Spain
Expatriate footballers in Ukraine
Naturalised citizens of Spain
Spanish people of Paraguayan descent
Paraguayan expatriate sportspeople in Cyprus
Paraguayan expatriate sportspeople in Israel
Paraguayan expatriate sportspeople in Mexico
Paraguayan expatriate sportspeople in Spain
Paraguayan expatriate sportspeople in Ukraine